Kabwe is an African name that may refer to:


Given name 
Kabwe Kamuzati (born 1984), Zambian football player
Kabwe Kasongo (born 1970), Congolese football player

Surname 
Joseph Kabwe (born 1980), Zimbabwean football player
Rodrick Kabwe (born 1992), Zambian football midfielder 
Zitto Kabwe (born 1976), Tanzanian politician

Zambian surnames
Zambian given names
Bemba-language surnames
Bemba-language given names